Stelian-Cristian Ion (born 24 June 1977) is a Romanian politician who served as Minister of Justice in the Cîțu Cabinet, led by Prime Minister Florin Cîțu, from 23 December 2020 to 1 September 2021.

His sacking as Minister of Justice threatened the survival of Florin Cîțu's coalition government, especially with the withdrawal of USR PLUS party members and two motions of no confidence filed in less than a month, leading to a almost three-month long major political crisis in Romania.

References 

Living people
1977 births
People from Constanța
21st-century Romanian politicians
Romanian Ministers of Justice
University of Bucharest alumni